The athletics competition at the 2003 Summer Universiade was held on the Daegu World Cup Stadium in Daegu, South Korea, between 25 August and 30 August 2003.

Medal summary

Men's events

Women's events

Medal table

References

External links
World Student Games (Universiade - Men) - GBR Athletics
World Student Games (Universiade - Women) - GBR Athletics
Results - FIBU

 
2003 Summer Universiade
Universiade
Athletics at the Summer Universiade